Kalynivka is a village in Horlivka Raion (district) in Donetsk Oblast of eastern Ukraine, at 54.5 km NE from the centre of Donetsk city.

The village was taken under control of pro-Russian forces during the War in Donbass, that started in 2014. Ukrainian forces took the village under their control in December 2016.

Demographics
Native language as of the Ukrainian Census of 2001:
Ukrainian — 59.82%
Russian 40.18%

References

Villages in Horlivka Raion